El Bolsón Airport  is an airport serving El Bolsón, Río Negro, Argentina.

Airlines and destinations

Accidents and incidents
7 August 1977: A LADE Twin Otter 300, tail number T-87, crashed into Cerro Bayo shortly after takeoff from the airport, bound for Comodoro Rivadavia, killing all six aboard.

See also

List of airports in Argentina

References

External links

Airports in Argentina